The term erotolepsy was first used by Thomas Hardy in his 1895 novel Jude the Obscure to describe a passionate sensual desire and longing which is more violent and urgently felt than erotomania. It has been variously described as "love-seizure" and "sexual recklessness". Derived from eroto- and -lepsy, it has since become more widely used, including by American poet Susan Mitchell in her 2001 poetry collection Erotikon.

References

Love